Hakatoa Tupou (born circa 1958) is a Tongan former rugby union player. He played as prop.

Career
Tupou first played for the 'Ikale Tahi against Samoa on 25 August 1982, in Nuku'alofa. He was also called up for the Tonga squad for the 1987 Rugby World Cup, where he played against Wales and against Ireland, the latter being his last international cap. He earned 4 points, 1 try and 0 conversions in aggregate.

Personal life
In 1979 he married Senilaite Tautuiaki of Āhau, Tongatapu, Tonga Is. They had six children of three boys and girls. He provided for his family through his rugby career and work where he played for the Ikale Tahi team at 1987 World Cup against Wales. He was a heavy machine manager at the Yakka Demolition where he last worked before he died. He was also a member of the Upper Room Church.

References

External links
Hakatoa Tupou international stats

1959 births
Tongan rugby union players
Rugby union props
Tonga international rugby union players
Living people